The Mythmaker is a 1957 spy thriller novel  by the British writer Sarah Gainham, her third published novel. At with many of her works it takes place in Vienna, where she settled in the post-war era. It was released in the United States in 1958 under the alternative title Appointment in Vienna.

Synopsis
Kit Quest, a half-Hungarian British Army officer travels to Vienna on the pretext of visiting his family but in fact he is charged with hunting down a war criminal Otto Berger.

References

Bibliography
 Burton, Alan. Historical Dictionary of British Spy Fiction. Rowman & Littlefield, 2016.
 Reilly, John M. Twentieth Century Crime & Mystery Writers. Springer, 2015.
 Smith, Myron J. & White, Terry. Cloak and Dagger Fiction: An Annotated Guide to Spy Thrillers. Greenwood Press, 1995.

1957 British novels
Novels by Sarah Gainham
British thriller novels
British spy novels
Novels set in Vienna
Arthur Barker Limited books